Melissa Brown (born April 11, 1968) is a former tennis player from the U.S. who was a quarter-finalist at the 1984 French Open. In this tournament, she defeated Hélène Cedet, Wendy White, Michelle Torres and Zina Garrison, then lost to Hana Mandlíková.

References

External links
 
 

1968 births
Living people
American female tennis players